This is a list of the writings of Charles Darwin.

Published works
 1829–1832. [Records of captured insects, in] Stephens, J. F., Illustrations of British entomology 
 1835: Extracts from Letters to Henslow (Read at a meeting of the Cambridge Philosophical Society on 16 November 1835, with comments by John Stevens Henslow and Adam Sedgwick, and printed for private distribution dated 1 December 1835. Selected remarks had been read by Sedgwick to the Geological Society of London on 18 November 1835, and these were summarised in Proceedings of the Geological Society published in 1836. Further extracts were published in the Entomological Magazine and, with a review, in the Magazine of Natural History. A reprint was issued in 1960, again for private distribution.)
 1836: A LETTER, Containing Remarks on the Moral State of TAHITI, NEW ZEALAND, &c. – BY CAPT. R. FITZROY AND C. DARWIN, ESQ. OF H.M.S. 'Beagle.'''
 1838–1843: Zoology of the Voyage of H.M.S. Beagle:  published between 1839 and 1843 in five Parts (and nineteen numbers) by various authors, edited and superintended by Charles Darwin, who contributed sections to two of the Parts:
1838: Part 1 No. 1 Fossil Mammalia, by Richard Owen (Preface and Geological introduction by Darwin)
1838: Part 2 No. 1 Mammalia, by George R. Waterhouse (Geographical introduction and A notice of their habits and ranges by Darwin)
 1839: Journal and Remarks (The Voyage of the Beagle)
 1842: The Structure and Distribution of Coral Reefs 1844: Geological Observations on the Volcanic Islands visited during the voyage of H.M.S. Beagle 1846: Geological Observations on South America 1849: Geology from A Manual of scientific enquiry; prepared for the use of Her Majesty's Navy: and adapted for travellers in general., John F.W. Herschel ed. 
 1851: A Monograph of the Sub-class Cirripedia, with Figures of all the Species. The Lepadidae; or, Pedunculated Cirripedes. 1851: A Monograph on the Fossil Lepadidae, or, Pedunculated Cirripedes of Great Britain 1854: A Monograph of the Sub-class Cirripedia, with Figures of all the Species. The Balanidae (or Sessile Cirripedes); the Verrucidae, etc. 1854: A Monograph on the Fossil Balanidæ and Verrucidæ of Great Britain 1858: On the Tendency of Species to form Varieties; and on the Perpetuation of Varieties and Species by Natural Means of Selection (Extract from an unpublished Work on Species)
 1859: On the Origin of Species by Means of Natural Selection, or the Preservation of Favoured Races in the Struggle for Life 1862: On the various contrivances by which British and foreign orchids are fertilised by insects 1865: The Movements and Habits of Climbing Plants (Linnean Society paper, published in book form in 1875)
 1868: The Variation of Animals and Plants Under Domestication 1871: The Descent of Man, and Selection in Relation to Sex 1872: The Expression of the Emotions in Man and Animals 1875: Insectivorous Plants 1876: The Effects of Cross and Self Fertilisation in the Vegetable Kingdom 1877: The Different Forms of Flowers on Plants of the Same Species 1879: "Preface and 'a preliminary notice'" in Ernst Krause's Erasmus Darwin 1880: The Power of Movement in Plants 1881: The Formation of Vegetable Mould through the Action of WormsAutobiography
 1887: Autobiography of Charles Darwin (edited by his son Francis Darwin)
 1958: Autobiography of Charles Darwin (Barlow, unexpurgated)

Correspondence
Correspondence of Charles Darwin
 1887: Life and Letters of Charles Darwin (ed. Francis Darwin)
 1903: More Letters of Charles Darwin'' (ed. Francis Darwin and A.C. Seward)

References

External links
The Complete Works of Charles Darwin Online

Darwin, Charles
Darwin, Charles
Darwin, Charles
Darwin, Charles